Edward Jay Blum is a conservative legal strategist known for his activism against affirmative action based on race and ethnicity. He connects potential plaintiffs with attorneys who are willing to represent them in "test cases" which he tries to use to set legal precedents. He is the director and sole member of the Project on Fair Representation, which he founded in 2005.  According to its website, the Project focuses specifically on voting, education, contracting, employment, racial quotas, and racial reparations.  Since the 1990s, Blum has been heavily involved in bringing six cases to the United States Supreme Court. He is a key figure in the Students for Fair Admissions v. President and Fellows of Harvard College lawsuit.

Early life
Blum was born into a Jewish family in Benton Harbor, Michigan, where his parents owned and operated the local shoe store. He graduated from the University of Texas at Austin in 1973. He then studied West African writers for a year at the State University of New York at New Paltz. 
He describes his parents as generally left-wing liberals who supported Democratic presidents like Franklin Roosevelt and Harry S. Truman and that he was, eventually, "the first Republican my mother ever met".

Political interest
While working as a stock broker in Houston, Texas in the early 80s, he became involved in the neoconservatism movement. In 1990, he realized that the Democratic incumbent in his congressional district, Craig Anthony Washington, was running unopposed, so decided to run against him for the Republican Party. During that campaign, Blum and his wife Lark went door-knocking and realized that the boundaries of their district erratically divided streets based on ethnicity, with the suspected purpose to gerrymander a majority African-American district in order to grant increased voting power to minorities. Blum eventually lost the congressional race.  But he and others filed a lawsuit against the state of Texas, claiming that the racially gerrymandered districts violated the Fourteenth Amendment.  The case, Bush v. Vera, went to the Supreme Court, which ruled in Blum's favor.

Activism
Blum holds a fellowship at the American Enterprise Institute (AEI).  His areas of research at AEI include civil rights policy, affirmative action, multiculturalism, and redistricting.  He has also written the book, The Unintended Consequences of Section 5 of the Voting Rights Act (2007).

His litigation includes United States Supreme Court cases Bush v. Vera (1996), Northwest Austin Municipal Utility District No. 1 v. Holder (2009), Fisher v. University of Texas (2013), Shelby County v. Holder (2013), Evenwel v. Abbott (2016), and Fisher v. University of Texas II (2016).

In Shelby County, the Supreme Court struck down Section 4 of the Voting Rights Act of 1965, which subjected certain states and parts of states to federal scrutiny when they tried to modify voting procedures.  This scrutiny, known as "preclearance", was intended to prevent states from enacting voting procedures that disproportionately burden racial minorities.  After unsuccessfully lobbying Congress to modify the preclearance rules in the Act's 2006 reauthorization, Blum set out to challenge the Act's constitutionality in court.  He wanted to change or eliminate the law because it had led to the pro-minority gerrymandering which he encountered in the 1990s when he ran for Congress.

In Evenwel, Blum recruited Texas voters to sue Texas in a constitutional test case. Texas, like other states, divides its state legislative districts in a way that equalizes the total population of each district. However, some districts have more eligible voters than others because they have fewer minors, non-citizen immigrants, and convicted felons. Blum and his recruited plaintiffs contended that this discriminates against voters in districts with high numbers of eligible voters, since each person's vote has less power. They wanted the Supreme Court to mandate that districts be drawn based on voter-eligible population rather than total population. In an April 2016 ruling, the Supreme Court upheld Texas's district scheme.

The Fisher case, which challenged the University of Texas's consideration of race in its undergraduate admissions process, was decided at the Supreme Court in 2013 and again in 2016. The first time, the Court bolstered the legal standard that universities must satisfy if they wish to consider race, emphasizing that the use of race is only permissible if race-neutral alternatives would be ineffective at producing campus diversity. The second time, the Court applied the heightened legal standard to UT's admission policy, concluding that it passes muster and upholding it.

Project on Fair Representation
Edward Blum is also challenging race-conscious admissions policies at other selective universities, claiming that they do not comply with the strict legal standard set forth in Fisher. To that end, he has founded Students for Fair Admissions, an offshoot of the Project on Fair Representation. This organization seeks to recruit students who have been rejected by selective universities and file lawsuits on their behalf. Specifically, Blum is targeting Harvard University, the University of North Carolina at Chapel Hill, and the University of Wisconsin at Madison. He set up websites called harvardnotfair.org, uncnotfair.org, and uwnotfair.org to attract plaintiffs.  Students for Fair Admissions, led by Blum, filed federal lawsuits against Harvard and UNC-Chapel Hill in November 2014. (SFFA has not sued UW-Madison thus far). On October 1, 2019 the Court ruled in favor of Harvard University. In the 130-page ruling, Judge Burroughs found that the University did not discriminate on the basis of race, did not engage in racial balancing or the use of quotas, and did not place too much emphasis on race when considering an applicant’s admissions file. She also wrote that, "Harvard has demonstrated that no workable and available race-neutral alternatives would allow it to achieve a diverse student body while still maintaining its standards for academic excellence."  Other cases are pending in federal district court. Unlike the Fisher case, in which the plaintiff, Abigail Fisher, made herself public, the students rejected by Harvard and UNC have not revealed their identities because they want to shield themselves from potential retaliation. Rather, the named plaintiff is simply "Students for Fair Admissions", and that organization is prepared to assure the courts that it does in fact have members who were injured by the universities' use of race.

Alliance for Fair Board Recruitment
Edward Blum is listed as the President of the Alliance for Fair Board Recruitment, which is the plaintiff in lawsuits challenging diversity requirements for boards of certain publicly traded companies. The group has sued to challenge California's race and gender quotas, and Nasdaq's comply-or-explain rule.

Works

See also
Abigail Thernstrom
Stephan Thernstrom

References

Further reading

Hartocollis, Anemona (November 19, 2017). "He Took On the Voting Rights Act and Won. Now He’s Taking On Harvard." The New York Times. Retrieved November 29, 2017.

External links
Project on Fair Representation – Official website
SCOTUSblog On Camera: Edward Blum – Interview by SCOTUSblog

Year of birth missing (living people)
Living people
People from Benton Harbor, Michigan
State University of New York at New Paltz alumni
University of Texas at Austin alumni
American Jews